Powerless is an American sitcom television series developed by Ben Queen, that aired on NBC from February 2, to April 20, 2017. The series was a sitcom set within the world of the DC Universe. The pilot, which was green lit in August 2015, was ordered to series on May 11, 2016. On April 25, 2017, NBC pulled the final three episodes of the series from its schedule, with no indication whether they would be rescheduled at a later date. The series was officially cancelled on May 11. The unaired episodes were made available on TVNZ OnDemand starting the day later.

Premise
Powerless takes place in the DC Universe and follows the adventures of Emily Locke (Vanessa Hudgens) as Director of Research & Development at Wayne Security, a subsidiary of Wayne Enterprises based in Charm City, that specializes in products for ordinary humans who are poised to be victims of the battles between superheroes and supervillains.

The storylines in the television series are not directly based on storylines in the DC comic franchise, including the Batman franchise. Rather the premise imagines stories that run parallel to the plots in the comic franchise.

Cast and characters
 Vanessa Hudgens as Emily Locke:The director of Research & Development for Wayne Security, a subsidiary of Wayne Enterprises that specializes in products that make defenseless bystanders in a world of superheroes and supervillains feel a little safer. She loves her job because she gets to help people.
 Danny Pudi as Teddy: He works underneath Emily, he spends his days creating time-wasting pranks as a way to make their office, that he calls "the least super place on earth", just a little less "un-super".
 Christina Kirk as Jackie: Van's personal assistant.
 Ron Funches as Ron: He works with Teddy. In the episode "Sinking Day", it's revealed he's from Atlantis, although others believed he was from Atlanta. He won't tell anyone he serves under their King Arthur Curry aka Aquaman.
 Alan Tudyk as Vanderveer "Van" Wayne:The boss of Wayne Security who is the son of Vanderveer Wayne Sr. and the cousin of Bruce Wayne. He aspires to work in the Gotham office with Bruce. The character was created by Batman's original writer Bill Finger with artist Sheldon Moldoff, and made his first appearance in Batman vol. 1, #148 (June 1962).
 Jennie Pierson as Wendy: She works with Teddy and Ron.

Atlin Mitchell had been cast in a recurring role as Crimson Fox. Adam West, who portrayed Bruce Wayne / Batman in 1960s television series Batman and its theatrical feature film, reprised the role in narrating the pilot episode, introducing Wayne Security.  He also portrayed Chairman West on the 11th episode, "Win, Luthor, Draw".  Marc McClure, who portrayed Jimmy Olsen in the 1978–87 initial Superman film series, portrayed Emily Locke's father in the pilot.

Production
In January 2016, it was reported that NBC gave the pilot order for Powerless. In February 2016, the main cast was announced: Vanessa Hudgens as the main character, Emily Locke, Danny Pudi as Teddy, Alan Tudyk as Van and Christina Kirk as Jackie. In July 2016, Ron Funches joined the cast as Ron. In August 2016, it was reported that Ben Queen had departed as showrunner. On April 25, 2017, NBC pulled the final three episodes of the series from its schedule, with no indication of if they would be rescheduled at a later date.

Segue shots of Charm City feature a western view of the Cleveland skyline with fictional buildings, including the skyscraper headquarters of Wayne Security, occupying the foreground.

The episode "Emergency Punch-Up" was mistakenly aired instead of "Van v Emily: Dawn of Justice" in Canada, several regions of the US and on the NBC website, the running order had been changed because of the prominence of a chemical gas attack in the episode which similarly occurred in Syria just before the episode was aired. "Win, Luthor, Draw" was subsequently released on DC Comics' YouTube channel on June 16, 2017, a week after West's death.

Episodes

Reception

Critical response
After the original pilot was shown at Comic Con 2016, reviews were generally positive. Eric Goldman of IGN gave it a 7.5/10 saying "it's very  endearing and amusing and has me looking forward to seeing where it can go". Sydney Bucksbaum of Nerdist praised the pilot episode, saying it's "the superhero comedy we deserve" and "Fans of comic books, office comedy, rom-coms or just having a good laugh, Powerless is for you."
After the Pilot episode aired at SDCC 2016, series creator Ben Queen departed the series, after which it was given a new premise and almost the entire episode was rewritten and reshot without Queen or original director Michael Patrick Jann.

The reviews for the second pilot episode of Powerless were much less positive. Review aggregation website Rotten Tomatoes reported a 64% critic approval rating with an average rating of 5.36/10 based on 33 reviews. The website's consensus reads, "Powerless has a strong premise leaving room for improvement -- and strong performances from a talented cast -- but the show's initial spark is dimmed by uneven execution and a lack of laughs." Metacritic, which uses a weighted average, assigned a score of 57 out of 100 based on 26 reviews, indicating "mixed or average reviews".

Jesse Schedeen of IGN gave the pilot episode a 4.2/10 saying "there's a lot of potential in that idea, but very little of it is realized here" calling the script "lousy" and calling the show "generic". Yahoo's Dominic Patten called Powerless "a charming comedy with legs and a smart premise". The opening credits, which were part of the original pilot and which use classic artists like Carmine Infantino, were praised by Yahoo's Ken Tucker, saying "the credits aren't funny, they're just beautiful", while Sonia Saraiya praised the cast, particularly Vanessa Hudgens as Emily Locke calling her performance charming, and Tudyk's performance as "the standout". Additionally she said she is optimistic about the show, saying that "there’s a light, nimble humor to the show’s treatment of superpowers and heroic antics — a much needed respite".

After the first two episodes were panned by critics, the third and fourth episodes received favorable reviews. Jesse Schedeen of IGN gave "Sinking Day" a 7.2/10, saying that "the show improves enough in its third episode to leave hope that the show will eventually realize its full potential". About the fourth episode "Emily dates a Henchman", Jesse Schedeen gave it an 8/10 saying that "the show still isn't particularly deep, and it still struggles to take advantage of every member of the main cast, it is developing into an entertainingly goofy take on the DC Universe".

Ratings

References

External links

 
 

2010s American single-camera sitcoms
2010s American workplace comedy television series
2017 American television series debuts
2017 American television series endings
American action television series
English-language television shows
NBC original programming
Superhero television series
Television shows based on DC Comics
Television series by Warner Bros. Television Studios
Television shows filmed in Vancouver
Television shows filmed in Los Angeles
Television shows set in the United States